Benjamin Thomas Romain Morel (born 10 June 1987) is a French footballer who plays as a winger.

Career
On 1 February 2016 he signed with the Bulgarian team Beroe Stara Zagora after two weeks trial. On 5 June 2016 he returned to Domžale. He terminated his contract with Domžale on 1 October 2016.

Career statistics

References

External links
PrvaLiga profile 
Benjamin Morel at Footballdatabase

1987 births
Living people
Footballers from Caen
French footballers
Association football wingers
Ligue 1 players
Ligue 2 players
French expatriate footballers
French expatriate sportspeople in Slovenia
Expatriate footballers in Slovenia
French expatriate sportspeople in Bulgaria
Expatriate footballers in Bulgaria
Slovenian PrvaLiga players
US Alençon players
SU Dives-Cabourg players
Stade Malherbe Caen players
Clermont Foot players
Amiens SC players
US Granville players
NK Domžale players
PFC Beroe Stara Zagora players